A Double-square painting is a painting made on uncommonly large canvases, which have one dimension that is twice the size of the other. Vincent van Gogh used  double-squares almost exclusively during the final weeks of his life in Auvers, in June and July 1890. Other artists who have painted double-square canvases include Charles-François Daubigny, Puvis de Chavannes, and Ivon Hitchens.

Description 
In a double-square painting, one dimension of the canvas is twice the size of the other, so that the canvas is the shape of two adjoining squares. The overall effect of this is stability, and the compositional challenge is to avoid monotony.

Use 
Prior to Van Gogh, artists such as Charles-François Daubigny and Puvis de Chavannes had used canvases of similar proportions, and Van Gogh was aware of this.

Van Gogh's Double-square canvases 

Vincent van Gogh used double-squares almost exclusively during the final weeks of his life in Auvers, in June and July 1890. To arrive at this size, Van Gogh combined the legs of two standard sizes: the 50 cm leg from a size 12 and the 100 cm leg of a size 40 stretcher. His choice of this size points into another direction from previous artists; his double-squares can easily be combined with size 30 canvases to more elaborated décorations, and his squares extend these possibilities.

Subsequent uses of the dimensions 
Ivon Hitchens worked primarily in double-squares at certain periods in his career.

Footnotes

References 
 Pickvance, Ronald:
 Zemel, Carol:

Paintings by Vincent van Gogh
Series of paintings by Vincent van Gogh
1890 paintings